Doop is a fictional character appearing in American comic books published by Marvel Comics. The character appears in the Marvel Universe, created by writer Peter Milligan and artist Mike Allred. He made his debut in X-Force #116. He is a green, floating reniform creature of unknown origins who speaks in a "language" all his own (represented in text by a special font).

Publication history
Doop first appeared in X-Force #116, and appeared in every issue until the end of the series, and then appeared in all issues of X-Statix. Doop also appeared alongside Wolverine in a two-issue limited series and then in Wolverine & the X-Men, and had his own comic book mini series called "All New Doop".

Fictional character biography
Doop was said to be the product of a Cold War era U.S. military experiment, becoming instrumental in the fall of the Soviet Union.

He later served as the cameraman for the celebrity mutant superhero team X-Statix (formerly known as X-Force). He films a mission to North Africa which is later criticized by then-team leader Zeitgeist; he feels Doop should not be going for artistic shots. The next X-Force mission is to New York, where they are to rescue the boy band "Boyz R Us" from hostage takers. While in the briefing room, U-Go Girl asks Doop not to keep shooting her rear from a low angle. Doop replies in his language only the characters know, while inexplicably mouthing some of his recording equipment.

The building is attacked by a helicopter gunship, killing the hostages and many of the terrorists. Most of the team dies also, with the exception of Doop, U-Go Girl and Anarchist. Doop gets high-quality images of the two slaying the remaining killers.

Plush Doop dolls are seen on sale at the X-Statix cafe, for five dollars apiece. One of these is vandalized by Wolverine.

At one point, Doop secretly videotapes the rookie X-Statix member El Guapo succumbing to the temptations of fame and having a threesome. The released video destroys El Guapo's relationship with his original girlfriend.

A section of X-Force headquarters is set aside for Doop's family, who are never seen in panel. This part is talked about very little by the team. The team hides in this area when they believed themselves to be in supernatural danger.

Corkscrew

In a training/audition session for X-Statix, one of the applicants, Corkscrew, needlessly kills an opponent. It is discussed that Doop would take care of matters. Despite the seriousness of an innocent man having just died, Doop makes a joke in his language, which greatly entertains the team members present.

Doop is sent on a camping trip with Corkscrew. At the end he simply kills Corkscrew with an axe, but not before subjecting the mentally unstable mutant to psychological torture. Part of this is tricking the man into killing wild horses.

Brain power

In one incident, Doop's brain explodes, and parts of it land all across the world. X-Statix and Avengers fight each other to gain control of the brain pieces. Doop, running on a backup brain in his butt and now capable of human speech, joins in. He fights Thor to a standstill, sucking in his hammer Mjolnir and recreating multiple copies. Captain America states that Doop was an American-created super-weapon that was capable of destroying the entire planet. The Avengers, in the end, allow Doop back in to X-Statix custody, after they show courage and responsibility in facing the Asgardian threat of the "Three Sisters".

He is acquainted with Wolverine, and the two even teamed up in a two-issue miniseries.

It was revealed that at some indeterminate point in Doop's life, he had an affair with a beautiful married woman. Her husband hired a private investigator, Chandler, to spy on his errant wife. Chandler found himself falling in love with Doop. In the end, Doop ditched the woman to have an affair with the detective.

Doop and Daap
After the incident with the Avengers, X-Statix holds a farewell party, attended by fans and multiple superheroes. They are hired for one last mission, ridding a billionaire's mansion of terrorists that have taken control of the building. Doop's teammate Anarchist notes that this resembles a mission in the past where all but two X-Force members die. Not only is the mansion full of gunmen, it is also surrounded by attack helicopters. The uniforms of the gunmen are identical to the ones that the 'Boyz R Us' hostage takers wore. During the mission everyone — Doop included — apparently perishes. Doop is seen sprawled in a chair with a large stomach wound.

However, the vacationing X-Men Havok and Polaris encounter a Doop-like entity when it crashes to Earth from outer space. Polaris immediately identifies the creature as the same being she had previously seen in space and calls it Daap. Havok eventually blasts it to pieces but it begins to reform itself. Its amorphous jelly-like remains then fly off with both Polaris and the mutant-hating Leper Queen. The true identity of Daap and any connection it has with Doop is left unrevealed.

Return
Doop returns in a story published in the Nation X anthology series, where he is brought onboard Utopia as a private investigator. The story is revealed to be nothing more than a dream, and that Doop is later shown living with a beautiful woman elsewhere. The first issue of Wolverine and the X-Men lists Doop as an adjunct member of the teaching staff at the Jean Grey Institute for Higher Learning. He is eventually shown substituting for Kitty Pryde's "Introduction to Religion" class, though, under Doop, the course largely consists of watching films while Doop takes naps. The students are shown to be comically unable to decipher Doop's lesson plan. Teaching, however, is a cover for Doop's real position.  Wolverine alone knows that Doop is actually the secret protector of the school, spending most of his time gathering and acting upon information regarding possible threats to the students. He again protects the unwary students from a super-villain attack, post-graduation, using sonics.

Doop makes a comeback in Young Avengers as the designated driver at the end of the Young Avengers' party. He is seen waiting with his arms crossed on the jet's loading ramp as Transonic carries an asleep Pixie on board.

After semi-regular appearances in Wolverine and the X-Men, Doop returned in April 2014 in his own 5-issue mini-series, All New Doop, written by creator Peter Milligan, penciled by David Lafuente, with covers by Mike Allred. This series focuses on Doop's romantic feelings for Kitty Pryde. It also has the return of Doop's old teammate, the Anarchist.

Powers and abilities 
Doop's abilities displayed in the comics thus far have included superhuman strength and durability, flight, regeneration, physical malleability, a vaguely defined ability to manipulate time and/or space, and the ability to replicate physical objects by unknown means. In the "silent" issue of X-Force, he accidentally sucked the entire team into his body or mind via a popped pimple. He entered himself by picking at the pimple, and rescued his teammates from their own subconscious minds. When they were restored to reality, none but Doop was aware of what had occurred, and only a fraction of a second had actually passed.

Doop uses his mouth as a storage space for his camera equipment, among other items; it is unknown whether these items are simply stored inside his physical body or are actually transported to another dimension like the one to which his teammates were transported.

In the "Lacuna" storyline in X-Force, Lacuna's ability to stop time does not affect Doop. Whatever his control over time or space may be, it is apparently not powerful enough for the team to use him for teleporting the group; they relied first on U-Go Girl and later on Venus Dee Milo for long-distance travel.

In the "X-Statix vs. Avengers" storyline in X-Statix, Doop's brain was removed from his body and forced to project energy blasts at his teammates (a power that he did not demonstrate previously or afterwards). The brain was accidentally smashed into fragments by Thor, but his second brain (in his hindquarters) was temporarily installed in his head until the original brain could be reassembled, though it was stated that this second brain would only keep him alive for a short time. Later, when Thor struck Doop with his hammer, Mjolnir, Doop absorbed the hammer into his body and fired Mjolnir and a number of duplicate hammers from his mouth at Thor.

Doop has stretched his facial features and tongue on numerous occasions, and once plucked an eye from his head and then replaced it. He expanded his body into a cushion in the Wolverine/Doop miniseries. It is unknown if Doop possesses any other powers. On the one instance where he was forced to kill someone, he apparently used an ordinary axe, although the killing itself was not actually depicted on-panel. Some time later, when Doop thought that Wolverine was dangerously insane, he was prepared to attack the X-Man with a broken glass bottle.

Doopspeak
In 2001, several websites claimed to have deciphered Doopspeak. Series editor Axel Alonso responded in an October 8, 2001 article by Eric J. Moreels on the X-Fan site (now Comixfan) which was previously part of Cinescape.com:

However, Doopspeak was revealed in 2014, at the back of Essential X-Men #57.

Merchandise
A figure of Doop was included with the Marvel Legends Series VI Deadpool figure.

A Marvel Mini-Bust of DOOP by Bowen Designs was released in October 2004, as part of Phase II, Bust # 88 and sculpted by Randy Bowen.

Fictional merchandise
Doop merchandise is popular in the Marvel universe, particularly among children; Paco Perez was seen wearing a Doop T-shirt, while Molly Hayes is the known owner of both a stuffed Doop doll and Doop poster. Jean Grey has also been seen with a Doop keychain. All members of X-Statix were fully merchandised.

Doop starred in his own action movie called 'Doop Hard'.

In other media

Television
 Doop makes a cameo appearance in the Ultimate Spider-Man episode "Back in Black". He is seen as part of a fantasy sequence that Peter Parker imagines.

Video games
 Doop is seen in the video games Marvel Heroes and Marvel Puzzle Quest

References

External links
 UncannyXmen.net Character Profile on Doop

Comics characters introduced in 2001
Characters created by Peter Milligan
Characters created by Mike Allred
Fictional bisexual males
Fictional characters who can manipulate time
Fictional characters with superhuman durability or invulnerability
Marvel Comics LGBT superheroes
Marvel Comics male superheroes
Marvel Comics characters with accelerated healing
Marvel Comics characters with superhuman strength